Hubert "Hugh" Watlington (born 11 March 1954) is a Bermudian windsurfer. He competed in the Windglider event at the 1984 Summer Olympics.

References

External links
 
 

1954 births
Living people
Bermudian windsurfers
Bermudian male sailors (sport)
Olympic sailors of Bermuda
Sailors at the 1984 Summer Olympics – Windglider
Place of birth missing (living people)